Lupinus spectabilis is a species of lupine known by the common name shaggyhair lupine. It is endemic to a section of the central Sierra Nevada foothills in Mariposa and Tuolumne Counties, where it is a member of the serpentine soils flora.

Description
Lupinus spectabilis is a hairy annual herb growing 20 to 60 centimeters tall. Each palmate leaf is made up of usually 9 leaflets measuring 1 to 4 centimeters in length. The inflorescence bears whorls of flowers each just over a centimeter in length. The flower is usually blue with a white patch on its banner, but all-white flowers have been noted. The fruit is a very hairy legume pod up to 5 centimeters long.

References

External links
Jepson Manual Treatment - Lupinus spectabilis
Lupinus spectabilis - Photo gallery

spectabilis
Endemic flora of California
Flora of the Sierra Nevada (United States)
Natural history of the California chaparral and woodlands
Natural history of Mariposa County, California
Natural history of Tuolumne County, California